Werner Erich Biel (25 November 1927 – 16 January 2006) was a German rower. He competed in the men's coxless four event at the 1952 Summer Olympics, representing Saar.

References

External links
 

1927 births
2006 deaths
German male rowers
Olympic rowers of Saar
Rowers at the 1952 Summer Olympics
Sportspeople from Saarbrücken